Anchusa officinalis, commonly known as the common bugloss or alkanet, is a plant species in the genus Anchusa.

The plant provides a great deal of nectar for pollinators. It was rated in the top 10 for most nectar production (nectar per unit cover per year) in a UK plants survey conducted by the AgriLand project which is supported by the UK Insect Pollinators Initiative.

Photo gallery

References

External links

officinalis
Plants described in 1753
Taxa named by Carl Linnaeus